A brilliant is a diamond or other gemstone cut in a particular form with numerous facets so as to have exceptional brilliance. The shape resembles that of a cone and provides maximized light return through the top of the diamond.

Even with modern techniques, the cutting and polishing of a diamond crystal always results in a dramatic loss of weight; rarely is it less than 50%. The round brilliant cut is preferred when the crystal is an octahedron, as often two stones may be cut from one such crystal. Oddly shaped crystals such as macles are more likely to be cut in a fancy cut—that is, a cut other than the round brilliant—which the particular crystal shape lends itself to.

Facet proportions and names

The original round brilliant-cut was developed by Marcel Tolkowsky in 1919. The ideal proportions are 100% diameter, 53% table, 43.1% pavilion and 16.2% crown. The girdle and culet (if anynot  part of Tolkowsky's original design) are cut from the ideal brilliant. The modern round brilliant consists of 58 facets (or 57 if the culet is excluded), ordinarily today cut in two pyramids placed base to base: 33 on the crown (the top half above the middle or girdle of the stone), truncated comparatively near its base by the table, and 25 on the pavilion (the lower half below the girdle), which has only the apex cut off to form the culet, around which 8 extra facets are sometimes added. In recent decades, most girdles are faceted. Many girdles have 32, 64, 80, or 96 facets; these facets are not counted in the total. While the facet count is standard, the actual proportions (crown height and angle, pavilion depth, etc.) are not universally agreed upon. Some gem cutters refer to an American brilliant cut or a Scandinavian brilliant cut.  According to Green et al. 2001:

Figures 1 and 2 show the facets of a round brilliant diamond.

Figure 1 assumes that the "thick part of the girdle" is the same thickness at all 16 "thick parts".  It does not consider the effects of indexed upper girdle facets.

Figure 2 is adapted from Figure 37 of Marcel Tolkowsky's Diamond Design, which was originally published in 1919.  Since 1919, the lower girdle facets have become longer.  As a result, the pavilion main facets have become narrower.

Cut grading

The relationship between the crown angle and the pavilion angle has the greatest effect on the look of the diamond. A slightly steep pavilion angle can sometimes be complemented by a shallower crown angle, and vice versa.

Other proportions also affect the look of the diamond:  
 The table ratio is highly significant.
 The length of the lower girdle facets affects whether Hearts and arrows can be seen in the stone, under certain viewers.
 Most round brilliant diamonds have roughly the same girdle thickness at all 16 "thick parts".
 So-called "cheated" girdles have thicker girdles where the main facets touch the girdle than where adjacent upper girdle facets touch the girdle. These stones weigh more (for a given diameter, average girdle thickness, crown angle, pavilion angle, and table ratio), and have worse optical performance (their upper girdle facets appear dark in some lighting conditions).
 So-called "painted" girdles have thinner girdles where the main facets touch the girdle than where adjacent upper girdle facets touch the girdle. These stones (such as EightStar-brand diamonds) have less light leakage at the edge of the stone (for a given crown angle, pavilion angle, and table ratio).  Some diamonds with painted girdles receive lower grades in the GIA's cut grading system, for reasons given in a 2005 GIA article.

Several groups have developed diamond cut grading standards. They all disagree somewhat on which proportions make the best cut. There are certain proportions that are considered best by two or more groups however.
 The AGA standards may be the strictest. David Atlas (who developed the AGA standards) has suggested that they are overly strict.
 The HCA (Holloway Cut Adviser) changed several times between 2001 and 2004. , an HCA score below two represented an excellent cut. The HCA distinguishes between brilliant, Tolkowsky, and fiery cuts.
 The American Gem Society (AGS) standards changed in 2005 to better match Tolkowsky's model and Octonus' ray tracing results. The 2005 AGS standards penalize stones with "cheated" girdles.  They grade from 0 to 10.
The GIA began grading cut on every grading report beginning 2006 based on their comprehensive study of 20,000 proportions with 70,000 observations of 2,000 diamonds. The single descriptive words are as follows: Excellent, Very Good, Good, Fair, and Poor.
The distance from the viewer's eye to the diamond is important.
The 2005 AGS cut standards are based on a distance of 25 centimeters (about 10 inches).
The 2004 HCA cut standards are based on a distance of 40 centimeters (about 16 inches).

Polish and symmetry are two important aspects of the cut. The polish grade describes the smoothness of the diamond's facets, and the symmetry grade refers to alignment of the facets.  With poor polish, the surface of a facet can be dulled, and may create blurred or dulled sparkle.  It may constantly look like it needs to be cleaned.  With poor symmetry, light can be misdirected as it enters and exits the diamond.

Hearts and arrows phenomenon

A diamond that has the top facet or "table facet" exactly perpendicular to the bottom of the diamond or "pavilion" and has its other facets precisely aligned with excellent symmetry, may show patterns that look like arrows from the top and hearts from the bottom.  Generally it will need to be viewed loose under a gemscope to see the pattern very well.  Although the hearts and arrows property is indicative of a top-tier cut, it does not always mean the diamond will be the most brilliant.  Optimal facet placement is the key to brilliance and more important than facet patterning.  Not all ideal round cuts will have the hearts and arrows effect either.

See also
 Diamond cut
 Diamond cutting
 Princess cut
 List of diamonds

References

External links
Antique Jewelry University - Brilliant Cut
Video: How a Diamond is Cut and Polished at Eurostar Diamonds International
 Tolkowsky, Marcel (1919). Diamond Design: A Study of the Reflection and Refraction of Light in a Diamond. London: E. & F.N. Spon, Ltd. (Web edition edited by Jasper Paulsen, Seattle, 2001.)

Diamond cutting
Gemstone cutting

pl:Szlif brylantowy
ru:Бриллиантовая огранка